The 2019–20 Borussia Mönchengladbach season was the 120th season in the football club's history and 12th consecutive and 52nd overall season in the top flight of German football, the Bundesliga, having been promoted from the 2. Bundesliga in 2008. In addition to the domestic league, Borussia Mönchengladbach also participated in this season's edition of the domestic cup, the DFB-Pokal. This was the 16th season for Mönchengladbach in the Borussia-Park, located in Mönchengladbach, North Rhine-Westphalia, Germany. The season covered a period from 1 July 2019 to 30 June 2020.

Players

Squad information

Transfers

Transfers in

Loans in

Transfers out

Loans out

Pre-season and friendlies

Competitions

Overview

Bundesliga

League table

Results summary

Results by round

Matches
The Bundesliga schedule was announced on 28 June 2019.

DFB-Pokal

Europa League

Group stage

Statistics

Appearances and goals

|-
! colspan=12 style=background:#dcdcdc; text-align:center| Goalkeepers

|-
! colspan=12 style=background:#dcdcdc; text-align:center| Defenders

|-
! colspan=12 style=background:#dcdcdc; text-align:center| Midfielders

|-
! colspan=12 style=background:#dcdcdc; text-align:center| Forwards

|-
! colspan=12 style=background:#dcdcdc; text-align:center| Players transferred out during the season

|-

References

Borussia Mönchengladbach seasons
Monchengladbach